Zalabiyeh or Pitulici is a fritter or doughnut found in several cuisines across Europe, the Middle East and West Asia. The fritter version is made from a semi-thin batter of wheat flour which is poured into hot oil and deep-fried. The earliest known recipe for the dish comes from a 10th-century Arabic cookbook and was originally made by pouring the batter through a coconut shell. Zalabiyeh is also the Arabic language term used by Mizrahi Jews for a deep-fried yeast dough, often topped with either honey or syrup, and known as burmuelos in Ladino.

History

The earliest known recipes for zalabiya comes from the 10th century Arabic cookbook Kitab al-Tabikh. In the old Al-Baghdadi book of recipes of the Arabs; the dough was poured through a coconut shell. This style of fritter is similar to the Indian jelabi and a 16th-century recipe from German cuisine for strauben made using a funnel.

Different methods have developed in the preparation of the pastry dessert. According to Muqadassi (10th-century CE), the people in Greater Syria during winter "[would] prepare the unlatticed type of Zalabiya. This would be the deep-fried bread fritter Zalabiya. Some are elongated in shape, similar to crullers, while the smaller ones, sometimes made into balls, are similar to the shape of dumplings." In North Africa, they would give the name Zalabiya to a different type of pastry, namely to the Mushabbak, being a deep-fried lattice-shaped pastry made by looping batter, and drenched in ʻasal (honey) syrup or qatr."

In 1280, the Jewish–Sicilian doctor Faraj ben Salim translated into Latin a pharmaceutical book, (English: The Table of Countries; Latin: Tacvini Aegritvdinvm et Morborum ferme omnium Corporis humani), which was authored by Ibn Jazla an Arab physician and consists of a number of Persian recipes, including one for "Zelebia".

Among Yemenite Jews, the zalabiyeh was a treat eaten especially during the winter months. In Yemen, the zalabiyeh was fried in a soapstone pot lined with oil about 1 cm. deep, in which oil and sometimes honey was mixed. There, zalabiyeh was "made from a soft yeast bread [and] which is fried on both sides in deep oil. There are those who add to the dough black cumin for improved taste. They are eaten while they are still hot, while some have it as a practice to eat them with honey or with sugar.".

Early known origins
According to  King David's daughter prepared fritters for her step-brother Amnon. By the 2nd-century CE, the name of the fritter had taken on the name sūfğenīn in Mishnaic Hebrew, a word derived from its sponge-like texture with alveolar holes.

Customs
Zalabiyeh are commonly eaten by Muslims during the month of Ramadan, and during the Diwali celebrations for Hindus and Indian Christian communities during Advent and Easter, and by Sephardic Jews for Hanukkah.
In Lebanon they are eaten on the night of January 5 to celebrate the baptism of Jesus Christ. The dough is mixed with aniseed and, in the South of the country, three holes are made in the dough to symbolize the Holy Trinity. They are eaten in both their elongated form and their round form on that day.

Zalabiyeh (or zelebi) are a traditional sufgan ("spongy dough") for Persian Jews.

Modern variations
The fritter is very common in the Indian subcontinent, in countries such as India, Pakistan, Sri Lanka, Nepal, Bangladesh, although made differently to that of the Middle Eastern and North African variety. In many Middle Eastern and North African countries, such as Iran, Iraq, Jordan, Syria, Lebanon, Tunisia, Algeria, Ethiopia, and also in Egypt, they resemble spongy-cakes fried in oil.

In Iran, where it is known as zolbiya, the sweet was traditionally given to the poor during Ramadan. There are several 13th century recipes of the sweet, the most accepted being mentioned in a cookbook by Muhammad bin Hasan al-Baghdadi.

In Iraq in the 20th-century, starch was a basic ingredient in their zalabiyeh, topped with sugar. In North Africa, zalabiyeh was often made with yoghurt added to the dry ingredients.

They are known as zlebia in Tunisian cuisine, jalebie in the Philippines, zülbiya in Azerbaijan, gwaramari in Nepal and jilapi in India.

See also
 Jalebi
Sfenj
 Sufganiyah

References

Arab cuisine
Egyptian cuisine
Yemeni cuisine
Iraqi cuisine
Middle Eastern cuisine
Tunisian cuisine
Azerbaijani cuisine
Indian cuisine
Fritters
Hanukkah foods
Doughnuts
Mizrahi Jewish cuisine